Dəhnəxəlil (also, Dakhnakhalil and Dekhne-Khalil) is a village and municipality in the Agdash Rayon of Azerbaijan.  It has a population of 1,518. The municipality consists of the villages of Dəhnəxəlil and Turyançay.

References 

Populated places in Agdash District